Kastna is a village in Tõstamaa Parish, Pärnu County, in southwestern Estonia, on the coast of Gulf of Riga. It has a population of 51 (as of 1 January 2011).

Kastna Manor was first mentioned in 1228.

Kastna St. Arsenius Orthodox church was built in 1904.

References

External links
Website of Kastna region (Kastna, Ranniku and Rammuka villages) 
Kastna holiday village

Villages in Pärnu County